Khalilur Rahman was a Bangladesh Army General and former Director General of Bangladesh Rifles and for Chief of Defence staff.

Career
He had started his career by joining the Pakistan Army. During the Bangladesh Liberation War he was confined in West Pakistan and repatriated to Bangladesh in 1973 after its independence in 1971. He was the Director General of Bangladesh Rifles from 22 February 1974 to 31 October 1975. He was the director general during the Assassination of Sheikh Mujibur Rahman, the president of Bangladesh. He pledged allegiance to the new government on Bangladesh Radio after the assassination.

References

Living people
Bangladesh Army generals
Director Generals of Border Guards Bangladesh
Year of birth missing (living people)
Bangladesh Krishak Sramik Awami League central committee members